Imago Mortis is a 2009 Italian-Spanish film directed by Stefano Bessoni. The supernatural thriller stars Geraldine Chaplin and is the first major screen appearance of her daughter, Oona. Richard Stanley, one of the film's scriptwriters described the film as a "Sort of a neo-giallo taking off from Dario Argento's Four Flies on Grey Velvet by way of Umberto Lenzi's Spasmo and DaVinci Code." Speaking about his hopes for the film, Bessoni said; “My film aspires to del revive fantasy cinema, as is happening in Spain”. It was released in Italy on 16 January 2009.

Plot
Bruno (Amarilla), a student at the rundown FW Murnau Film School comes across the thanatoscope, an ancient instrument of death. The instrument, created by scientist Girolamo Fumagalli immortalises on a plate the last image seen by the victim’s retina. The school's teachers, led by Countess Orsini (Geraldine Chaplin) are involved in a secretive plot concerning the instrument.

Cast
Geraldine Chaplin as Countess Orsini
Oona Chaplin as Arianna
Alberto Amarilla as Bruno
Leticia Dolera as Leilou
Álex Angulo as Caligari
Jun Ichikawa as Aki
Silvia De Santis as Elena

Reception
The film debuted at no. 5 in Spain, grossing $309,175 in its first week. The film took nearly €460,000 on its opening weekend in Italy.

Zacarías M. de la Riva was nominated by the International Film Music Critics Association for Best Original Score for a Horror/Thriller film.

References

External links
 
 
 Imago Mortis at Cineuropa

Italian horror films
Spanish horror films
2009 films
Films set in Turin
Films scored by Zacarías M. de la Riva
Films with screenplays by Richard Stanley (director)